Babor District is a district of Sétif Province, Algeria.

Districts of Sétif Province